Gurpreet is a given name. Notable people with the name include:

Gurpreet Kaur Bhatti (born Watford), British Sikh writer
Gurpreet Singh Dhuri (born 1983), Indian sculptor
Gurpreet Ghuggi (born 1971), Indian actor, comedian and politician
Gurpreet Singh Lehal (born 1963), professor in the Computer Science Department, Punjabi University, Patiala
Gurpreet Singh Sandhu (born 1992), Indian professional footballer
Gurpreet Kaur Sapra, Indian Administrative Service officer, District Commissioner of Mohali, Ajitgarh
Gurpreet Singh Shergill (born 1973), Indian musician
Gurpreet Singh (actor), Indian TV and film actor
Gurpreet Singh (artist) (born 1976), modern Indian painter
Gurpreet Singh (footballer) (born 1984), Indian footballer
Gurpreet Singh (kabaddi) (born 1979), representative for India in the sport of Kabaddi
Gurpreet Singh (professor), associate professor at Kansas State University
Gurpreet Singh (sport shooter) (born 1987), Indian sports shooter
Gurpreet Singh Wander (born 1960), cardiologist and academic based in Ludiana, Punjab, India